Eremophila undulata, commonly known as wavy-leaved eremophila, is a flowering plant in the figwort family, Scrophulariaceae and is endemic to Western Australia. It is a small shrub with greenish-brown flowers and leaves that have a wavy margin.

Description

The petal tube is greenish-brown or yellowish-green with glandular hairs on both inner and outer surfaces. The 4 stamens extend beyond the end of the petal tube.

Taxonomy and naming
Eremophila undulata was first formally described by Robert Chinnock in 1980 and the description was published in Journal of the Adelaide Botanic Garden.
The specific epithet (undulata) is a Latin word meaning "wavy" referring to the margins of the leaves.

Distribution and habitat
This eremophila is only known from a few small areas north of Rawlinna in the Great Victoria Desert biogeographic region near where the type specimen was found. It is common in those locations, growing in brown sandy soil in association with mallee and hummock grasses.

Conservation
Eremophila undulata is classified as  "Priority Two" by the Western Australian Government Department of Parks and Wildlife meaning that is poorly known and from only one or a few locations.

Use in horticulture
Although its flowers are greenish, the flowers of this eremophila are produced in large numbers and are attractive to nectar-feeding birds. The wavy leaves are an added attraction. It can be grown from seed, from cuttings or by grafting onto Myoporum and the shrub grows best in well-drained soil in a sunny position. It only requires occasional watering during a long dry spell and is only damaged by the most severe frosts.

References

Eudicots of Western Australia
undulata
Endemic flora of Western Australia
Plants described in 1980
Taxa named by Robert Chinnock